The Men's Football Tournament at the 2023 Central American and Caribbean Games are scheduled to be held in San Salvador in May 2023.

Teams

 Dates and venues are those of final tournaments (or final round of qualification tournaments), various qualification stages may precede matches at these specific venues.
 The day when San Salvador was announced has host of the games.
</onlyinclude>

Squads

References

Football at the Central American and Caribbean Games
Central American and Caribbean Games
2022–23 in CONCACAF football
International association football competitions in the Caribbean